Arrakis Planitia is a planitia (plain) on Titan, the largest moon of the planet Saturn. It is located in Titan's southern hemisphere, between 74 and 80° south and 113–134° east, within the Mezzoramia region.

Arrakis Planitia is named after Arrakis, a fictional desert planet that is featured prominently in Frank Herbert's Dune novels. The name follows a convention that Titanean plains are named after planets in Herbert's work.

References

Plains
Surface features of Titan (moon)